Monnina equatoriensis is a species of plant in the family Polygalaceae. It is endemic to Ecuador.

References

equatoriensis
Endemic flora of Ecuador
Vulnerable plants
Taxonomy articles created by Polbot
Plants described in 1905